The  is a class of 1,000 ton-class PL type patrol vessels of the Japan Coast Guard (JCG).

Background 
Although these ships were excellent in security missions, they were also unsuitable for rescue missions because of their poor low-speed stability and cruising capacity.

For this purpose, construction of this class was started under the FY2009 supplement budget.

As a result of emphasis on versatility, the price soared, only two ships were built, more reasonable  was built from the following fiscal year. However, after that, additional construction was done to deploy on the Senkaku Islands in the FY2012 budgets. And construction is continuing from FY 2013 onwards, as construction costs have been reduced due to the mass production effect of this large-scale construction.

Design 
Due to the demand for multi-mission capabilities, displacement hull made of steel was adopted. Also, since low-speed stability was required, antiroll tanks was also installed in addition to fin stabilizers. The superstructure is made of aluminium alloy, but the bridge has bulletproofing structure introduced.

A helipad is set on the stern deck. Although there is no hangar, they can supply fuel and electric power to a helicopter on board.

As a main weapon, a JM61-RFS 20 mm rotary gun system with an optical director was installed on the early ships built under the FY2009 and FY2012. And more powerful Bushmaster II 30 mm chain gun system was installed on the late ships built under the FY2013 and following fiscal years.

In service 

The 10 Kunigami class ships leading JCG's increased focus on grey-zone challenges along with 2 Hateruma-class patrol vessels has made the base at Ishigaki JCG's largest base, surpassing Yokohama. The ships of FY2012 constitutes the main force of the task force deployed around the Senkaku Islands. And the ships built under the FY2013 and following fiscal years were deployed as replacements of the Shiretoko class.

Ships in the class

See also
 List of Japan Coast Guard vessels and aircraft

References

Patrol vessels of the Japan Coast Guard
Patrol ship classes